76th Brigade can refer to:

 76th Anti-Aircraft Brigade (United Kingdom)
 76th Brigade (Greece)
 76th Brigade (United Kingdom)
 76th Infantry Brigade Combat Team (United States)

See also
 76th Division (disambiguation)
 76 Squadron (disambiguation)